Miss America's Outstanding Teen 2022 was the 15th annual Miss America's Outstanding Teen pageant held in Orlando, Florida. Due to the COVID-19 pandemic, the planned 2021 edition was originally scheduled on August 8, 2020, the preliminary competitions were also scheduled on August 4–6, 2020, but it was postponed indefinitely. It has been announced that pageant would be held on July 10, 2021, with preliminary competitions were held on July 7–8, 2021.

Payton May of Washington crowned her successor, Marcelle LeBlanc of Alabama, at the end of the event.

Overview
The COVID-19 pandemic heavily disrupted the MAOT state pageant competitions were originally scheduled from late-March to June 2020 were postponed to 2021 or cancelled outright. However, five contestants had already crowned prior to the pandemic and they were Alabama, Minnesota, New Hampshire, New Jersey and Utah.

Due to restrictions implemented in 50 states and District of Columbia (except those state pageants were held prior to the pandemic), numerous health and safety guidelines have been implemented for contestants, production members, and audiences at state pageants, such as taking a negative COVID-19 test and following social distancing. Additionally, a number of state pageants have had to alter their initial venue choices due to shut-downs implemented by their governor.

Judges 

 Dolvett Quince – entrepreneur, fitness model, actor and The Biggest Loser trainer
 Natalie Ellis
 Ethan Zohn – Survivor winner and motivational speaker
 Dr. Brittany Revell
 Jasmine Murray – Miss Mississippi's Outstanding Teen 2007, Miss Mississippi 2014 and American Idol season 8 contestant

Results Summary

Placements 

§ America's/People's Choice

Order of announcements

Top 11

Top 5

Awards

Preliminary Awards

Other Awards

Contestants 
All 51 state titleholders have been crowned.

References

2022
2021 beauty pageants
Events postponed due to the COVID-19 pandemic